The International Virtual Observatory Alliance or IVOA is a worldwide scientific organisation formed in June 2002. Its mission is to facilitate international coordination and collaboration necessary for enabling global and integrated access to data gathered by astronomical observatories. An information system allowing such an access is called a Virtual Observatory. The main task of the organisation so far has focused on defining standards to ensure interoperability of the different virtual observatory projects already existing or in development.

The IVOA now comprises 19 VO projects from Argentina, Armenia, Australia, Brazil, Canada, China,
Europe, France, Germany, Hungary, India, Italy, Japan, Korea, Russia, Spain, Ukraine, the
United Kingdom, and the United States. Membership is open to other national and
international projects according to the IVOA Guidelines for Participation.

Senior representatives from each national VObs project form the IVOA Executive
Committee. A chair is chosen from among the representatives and serves a 1.5
year term, preceded by a 1.5 year term as deputy chair. The Executive
Committee meets 3-4 times a year to discuss goals, priorities, and strategies.

Members
IVOA currently brings together nineteen member organisations, both national and international :

Argentina Virtual Observatory
Armenian Virtual Observatory
AstroGrid|Virtual Observatory UK
Australian Virtual Observatory	
Brazilian Virtual Observatory
Chinese Virtual Observatory
Chilean Virtual Observatory
Canadian Virtual Observatory - ChiVO
European Space Agency
European Virtual Observatory - Euro-VO
German Astrophysical Virtual Observatory
Hungarian Virtual Observatory
Japanese Virtual Observatory
National Virtual Observatory USA - USA's VO
Observatoire Virtuel France
Russian Virtual Observatory
Spanish Virtual Observatory
Ukrainian Virtual Observatory
Italian Virtual Observatory
Virtual Observatory India

Working Groups
The tasks of the IVOA are distributed over different working groups:

Applications
The IVOA Applications Working Group is concerned primarily with the software tools that Astronomers use to access VO data and services for doing Astronomy.
The role of the Applications Working Group is to:
Provide a forum for announcement and discussion of VO Applications
Provide feedback to IVOA on the implementation of interoperability standards in VO applications
Identify missing or desirable technical capabilities for VO applications
Identify missing or desirable components in terms of scientific usability
Propose and develop standards specific to VO Astronomy-user-Applications

Data Access Layer
The task of the Data Access Layer (DAL) working group is to define and formulate VO standards for
remote data access. Client data analysis software will use these services to
access data via the VO framework; data providers will implement these services
to publish data to the VO.

The DAL working groups has defined various standards for accessing data sets, in
particular images (Simple Image Access Protocol, SIAP6), spectra (Simple Spectra
Access Protocol, SSAP7) and source catalogues (Simple Cone Search, SCS8).

Data Modelling
The role of the Data Modelling Working Group is to provide a framework for the description
of metadata attached to observed or simulated data.
The activity of the Data Model WG activity focuses on logical relationships
between these metadata, examines how an astronomer wants to retrieve,
process and interpret astronomical data, and provides an architecture to handle
them. What is defined in this WG can then be re-used in the protocols defined by
the DAL WG or in VO aware applications.

Grid and Web Services
The aim of the Grid and Web Services(GWS) Working Group is to define the use of Grid technologies and web
services within the VO context and to investigate, specify, and implement
required standards in this area. This group was formed from a merger of the Web
Services group and the Grid group, ordered at the IVOA Executive meeting held
during the IAU General Assembly in 2003.

Resource Registry
The Resource Registry Working Group defines the structure and interface to an IVOA Registry. Such
a registry “ … will allow an astronomer to be able to locate, get details of, and
make use of, any resource located anywhere in the IVO space, i.e. in any Virtual
Observatory. The IVOA will define the protocols and standards whereby different
registry services are able to interoperate and thereby realise this goal.”

Semantics
The Semantics Working Group will explore technology in the area of
semantics with the aim of producing new standards that aid the interoperability of
VO systems. The Semantics Working Group is concerned with the meaning or the
interpretation of words, sentences, or other language forms in the context of
astronomy. This includes standard descriptions of astrophysical objects, data
types, concepts, events, or of any other phenomena in astronomy. The WG
covers the study of relationships between words, symbols and concepts, as well
as the meaning of such representations (ontology). The WG covers use of natural
language in astronomy, including queries, translations, and internationalization of
interfaces.

VO Query Language
The VO Query Language (VOQL) Working Group will be in charge of defining a universal Query
Language to be used by applications accessing distributed data within the Virtual
Observatory framework.

VOTable
The VOTable Working Group is in charge of the VOTable format, which
is an XML standard for the interchange of data represented
as a set of tables. 
In this context, a table is an unordered set of rows, each of a
uniform format, as specified in the table metadata. Each row in a table is a
sequence of table cells, and each of these contains either a primitive data type, or
an array of such primitives. VOTable is derived from the Astrores format,
itself modelled on the FITS Table format; VOTable was designed to be closer
to the FITS Binary Table format.

Theory Interest Group
During the IVOA executive meeting of January 2004 in Garching, Germany, the
IVOA Theory Interest Group (TIG) was formed with the goal of ensuring that theoretical
data and services are taken into account in the IVOA standards process.
By its charter, the IVOA Theory Interest Group intends to:
Provide a forum for discussing theory specific issues in a VO context.
Contribute to other IVOA working groups to ensure that theory specific requirements are included.
Incorporate standard approaches defined in these groups when designing and implementing services on theoretical archives.
Define standard services relevant for theoretical archives.
Promote development of services for comparing theoretical results to observations and vice versa.
Define relevant milestones and assign specific tasks to interested parties.

References

External links
The International Virtual Observatory Alliance

Scientific organizations established in 2002
2002 establishments in Germany
Astronomical observatories